WXXL (106.7 FM) is a commercial radio station licensed to Tavares, Florida, and serving the Greater Orlando - Central Florida radio market. The station airs a Top 40/CHR radio format and is owned by iHeartMedia. The studios and offices on Maitland Center Drive in Maitland.

WXXL has an effective radiated power (ERP) of 100,000 watts.  The transmitter is on Story Road at Veterans Memorial Park in Winter Garden.

History
WXXL first began broadcasting in 1969 under the call sign WLBE-FM, as an MOR-format radio station. It was the sister station of WLBE (790 AM), also licensed to Leesburg. In 1977, the station was known as Y-106 broadcasting an adult contemporary format. The station first gained notice as a Top 40 radio station by the fall of 1984 as Leesburg-licensed WHLY-FM, still using the moniker Central Florida's Y-106. Shorter afterward, WDBO became an adult contemporary station. Among the personalities at the station in this era were Shadow, who hosted a music-intensive morning show, and program director Rick Stacy, now at WOCL.

By 1987, adult-focused Top 40 WBJW (BJ105) remained the ratings and revenue leader in Orlando, and Y-106 was still viewed as a teen and young-adult station. This resulted in the shift in call letters to WCAT-FM and the nickname The Cat, in a failed attempt to woo older listeners. The WHLY call letters returned, but the damage had been done. Furthermore, the rise of dance music, early hip-hop, hair bands and adult rock compounded the station's struggles. The station began broadcasting under the WXXL callsign on December 17, 1990, and later became Central Florida's dominant CHR station.

The original morning show for WXXL was Doc and Johnny in the Morning, later The XL Morning Zoo with Doc and Johnny, hosted by Jeffrey "Doc Holliday" Duncan and Johnny Magic. The morning show was a staple of the station from 1990 through 2007, when Doc resigned and jumped to Cox Radio, initially taking over the morning show at WWKA before hosting a talk radio show on WRSO.

Programming
Johnny has remained at WXXL, initially with Jayde Donovan until she moved to WPOI in Tampa to coincide with their flip to CHR. Donovan eventually moved to WPLJ in New York as part of Todd and Jayde in the Morning.

Johnny currently headlines the WXXL morning show as Johnny's House with co-hosts Brian Grimes and Sondra Rae.

In recent years, WXXL started bringing club disc jockeys in to mix music during late nights, beginning on Friday at 9:00 p.m. with “Extreme XL”, which was mixed by nationally syndicated mix show DJ JAYMAC. JAYMAC also mixed Club XL from 10:00 a.m. to midnight on Saturday nights. Club XL also featured a local club DJ who played top EDM and house tracks from midnight until 2:00 a.m.. These DJs and mixshows were removed from WXXL’s programming lineup by the end of January 2020. WXXL is also Orlando's station for On Air with Ryan Seacrest middays and American Top 40 on Sunday mornings. WXXL also aired the weekly syndicated “Club Kane” show until it ended following the week of May 3, 2020.

WXXL is consistently one of the top Nielsen-rated stations in the Orlando market, typically competing with WOMX-FM, a Hot AC station.

As of May 2022, WXXL was the only Top 40 radio station in the Orlando market after WPYO dropped Top 40/CHR for a Spanish contemporary hits format as a result of its sale to Spanish Broadcasting System. However, on August 1, 2022, WOTW flipped from country over to rhythmic contemporary as "Fly 103.1" and changed their call letters to WFYY, in which they now compete against them.

References

External links

XXL
Contemporary hit radio stations in the United States
Radio stations established in 1969
1969 establishments in Florida
IHeartMedia radio stations